Maud Evelyn Craven Jeffries (14 December 186926 September 1946) was an American actress. A popular subject for a wide range of theatrical post-cards and studio photographs, she was noted for her height, voice, presence, graceful figure, attractive features, expressive eyes, and beautiful face.

She married wealthy Australian grazier, Boer war veteran, and former aide-de-camp to New Zealand's Governor-General, James Bunbury Nott Osborne (1878-1934). Osborne was so enamoured of Jeffries that he joined her theatrical company in late 1903 in order to press his suit.

Engaged in May 1904, they married in October 1904, and had two children together (one of whom died as an infant). Jeffries left the stage in 1906, and continued to live a quiet, very happy life, devoted to her family and her beautifully designed gardens, on their family property, "Bowylie", at Gundaroo, NSW, until her death, at age 76, from cancer.

An audience favourite wherever she went, Jeffries' performances over a decade in New York, London, Australia, and New Zealand met wide critical acclaim, especially in the role of Desdemona in Shakespeare's Othello and, in particular, for her creation of the role of Mercia in Wilson Barrett's masterpiece The Sign of the Cross. On viewing Jeffries' performance (when just 20) as Almida in Claudian, one critic observed:

Early life and family 
Jeffries was born on 14 December 1869 at Willow Farm, near Lula in Coahoma County, Mississippi, to James Kenilworth Jeffries (1845-), a cotton planter, and his wife Elizabeth Field Jeffries, née Smith (1847-). She had three younger brothers: Henry (1872-), James K. jnr. (1875-), and Norman Weathers Jeffries (1877-1959). Norman went with his sister to Australia and New Zealand, as part of her theatre company, in 1897,<ref>"Society — Sailed Away: For Sydney", The  San Francisco Call, (Sunday, 14 November 1897), p.24;[http://nla.gov.au/nla.news-article14158669 Wilson Barrett's Arrival, The Sydney Morning Herald, (Monday, 6 December 1897), p.5].</ref> and remained with her company until she left the stage in 1906.

Initially educated at home, and originally intending to become a teacher, from the age of 13 she attended the prestigious Miss Higbee's School for Young Ladies in Memphis, Tennessee. A change in her family's fortunes meant that a career as a teacher was no longer possible, and her family encouraged her to pursue an acting career.

 Theatrical career 
From the age of 5, Jeffries regularly entertained her family with recitations; and, once at Miss Higbee's School for Young Ladies, in addition to her elocutionary skills, she also began to display a great talent at music, and at singing.

Apparently, when offstage, Jeffries was a somewhat modest and shy person; and, except for (perhaps, only) two occasions throughout her career — in The Memphis Daily Appeal of 9 July 1888, and The Seattle Post-Intelligencer, of 19 December 1897 — she refused to be interviewed by the press.

 United States (1887-1890) 
In October 1887, when Jeffries was just seventeen, she performed in Lizzie Evans's new play, Our Angel, at the New Memphis Theatre.

Leaving Memphis on 14 August 1888 for New York, she joined the Lizzie Evans company; however, within three weeks it was reported that "Miss Maud Jeffries has been compelled to give up her engagement with the Lizzie Evans company and has returned home for rest and quiet" — with a more detailed account emerging a week later:

In 1889 she went to New York and worked with Augustin Daly's company, playing small parts in pays such as "A Midsummer Night's Dream" and "As You Like It". Whilst working with Daly's company, she attracted the attention of Wilson Barrett.

 England (1890-1892) 

Jeffries left the United States on the RMS City of Chester on 6 August 1890, and arrived at Liverpool on 16 August 1890.

Her first appearance on the English stage was in a small part in a new play, The People's Idol, that Barrett had written in collaboration with Victor Widnell. She made her English debut, on 4 December 1890, in the play's first public performance: on the opening night of The New Olympic Theatre, in London's Drury Lane, an entirely new, purpose-built theatre, which Barrett also managed.

In August 1891, Wilson Barrett discovered that, due to a half forgotten arrangement made several years earlier, his leading lady at the time, "Maud Elmore", was contracted to appear with Morris Abrahams at the Pavilion Theatre for the whole of the 1891/1892 season.According to Thomas (1984, p.109), another actress, Mary Eastlake (1856-1911) who had been with Barrett for nine years, and had also been his "leading lady", had left Barrett's company a year earlier (towards the end of 1890), by amicable mutual agreement, and was touring the provinces, financed by Barrett — having been given the rights to perform the play "Clito" (co-written by Barrett and Sydney Grundy in 1886). Within days, it was being reported that "Miss Maud Jeffries, a former member of the Daly Company, is now leading lady in Mr. Wilson Barrett's company".

Perhaps her reaction to Barrett's unexpected announcement was somewhat amplified by the fact that, as a consequence of becoming his leading lady, she had to master a total of 14 leading roles in the space of just three weeks.

She soon settled into her new position, and by 22 October 1891, she was playing Desdemona, to Barrett's Othello, in the first performance of an entirely new production of Shakespeare's Othello, that Barrett had adapted to accommodate Jeffries "unique new school acting style" (Thomas, 1894, p. 111). Jeffries was an outstanding success and, throughout the rest of her career, her performances as Desdemona were considered to be amongst her finest roles.

 United States (1892-1895) 

Barrett's 1892/1893 tour opened in Philadelphia, on 21 November 1892, at the Duquesne Theater, with a performance of Hamlet.

Jeffries was involved in the creation of Wilson Barrett's play The Sign of the Cross, which was originally produced at the Grand Opera House, St. Louis, Missouri on 28 March 1895.

By the end of 1896, Jeffries was well-established as Barrett's leading lady, and had played opposite Barrett in a wide range of works, including:

 Shakespeare's Twelfth Night, Hamlet, and Othello Ben-my-Chree and The Bondman (stage versions of Hall Caine's novels The Deemster and The Bondman respectively)
 Brandon Thomas' The Color Sergeant Henry Arthur Jones and Henry Herman's Chatterton and The Silver King Barrett's The Miser (adapted from a poem, "A Masque", by Silas Weir Mitchell);
 Barrett's The People's Idol (written in collaboration with Victor Widnell)
 Barrett's The Acrobat (a version of Charles Dillon's Belphegor)
 Barrett's Jenny the Barber Henry Arthur Jones's A Clerical Error Barrett's Our Pleasant Sins Barrett's Pharoah Benjamin Thompson's The Stranger (a version of the melodramatic Menschenhass und Reue ("Misanthropy and Repentance") of August von Kotzebue)
 W. G. Wills' Claudian James Sheridan Knowles' Virginius Barrett's own masterpiece, The Sign of the Cross Australia (1897-1898) 
One of the unusual features of the company Barrett brought to Australia was that it also contained the brothers of three of his female stars: Norman Jeffries, the brother of Maud Jeffries, Daniel McCarthy, the brother of Lillah McCarthy, and Paul Belmore, the brother of Daisy Belmore (1874–1954).

Barrett's company opened its Australian season for J. C. Williamson at Melbourne's Princess Theatre (18 December 1897 – 2 March 1898), and then went on to Sydney's Her Majesty's Theatre (5 March-21 May 1898), Adelaide's Theatre Royal (4–16 June 1898), and Perth's Theatre Royal (21 June-1 July 1898), presented a number of different works at each theatre, the first of which was Claudian (with Jeffries as Almida);Amusements, The Age, (Monday, 20 December 1897), p.7. other works included Hamlet (with Jeffries as Ophelia), Othello (with Jeffries as Desdemona), Virginius (with Jeffries as Virginia), Ben-my-Chree, (with Jeffries as Mona), The Manxman (with Jeffries as Kate Cregeen), and The Silver King (with Jeffries as Nellie Denver).  On 16 July, the company left Sydney for Vancouver on the SS Aorangi.

 United Kingdom (1898-) 
Jeffries first appearance for this tour was with Barrett on 25 September 1898, at the Theatre Royal, in Cardiff, as Kate Cregeen in The Manxman. Jeffries' performance was outstanding, and there were 10 minutes of curtain calls.

 Australasia (1903-1906) 
Following an arrangement between J. C. Williamson and Herbert Beerbohm Tree, the company of Julius Knight (1863-1941) and Maud Jeffries toured Australasia for four years.

The first performance of the Knight-Jeffries Company in its farewell New Zealand season was a "double bill" of Davy Garrick and Comedy and Tragedy at Christchurch's Theatre Royal on 22 November 1905. The company performed in Christchurch, Dunedin, Wellington, Masterton, and Auckland, and its final performance was The Lady of Lyons, at Auckland's Her Majesty's Theatre, on Saturday, 17 February 1906.

The final performance of the Knight-Jeffries Company was with The Lady of Lyons, in Sydney's Palace Theatre, on 16 March 1906. After the final curtain the audience was addressed by Julius Knight, and by Maud Jeffries (in the company of her husband "who came from the wings, and was heartily cheered as he stood beside her").

Such was the impact of her Australian stage presence that, a decade later, one social correspondent was recalling Mrs. J.B.N. Osborne as "the handsome and graceful actress, Miss Maud Jeffries", whilst another theatre critic still believed that her performances far outshone those of the current favourite-of-the-day, Melbourne born actress Madge Titheradge. Even later, in 1917, a racing journalist was recalling her as "the statuesque American actress" who had married the Osborne brother "commonly known as 'Nott' Osborne".

 J.B.N. Osborne 

 Early life and family 
James Bunbury Nott Osborne (1878-1934) — most often referred to in the press as "J.B.N. Osborne", less often as "James Osborne" and, even, sometimes, as "Nott Osborne" — the son, and one of the nine children of Patrick Hill "Pat" Osborne (1832–1902) and Elizabeth Jane "Jeanie" Osborne (1847–1938), née Atkinson  was born on 14 May 1878 in Sydney. He attended Rugby School from 1892 to 1894.

 Soldier 

In early 1898, Osborne was appointed second lieutenant, in command of the Bungendore troop of the First Australian (Volunteer) Horse Regiment; and, a year later, "was proving [himself to be] not only a smart officer, but a very popular one with the men". In October 1899, he was one of two members of the New South Wales military forces to be briefly appointed honorary aides-de-camp to the staff of Earl Beauchamp, the Governor of New South Wales,The Defence Force, The (Sydney) Evening News, (Monday, 30 October 1899), p.7. who was also Honorary Colonel-in-Chief of the First Australian Horse Regiment.

He commanded the first troop of the 1st Australian Horse service squadron to be sent to South Africa. Lieutenant Osborne sailed with his troops for South Africa on the S.S. Langton Grange, leaving Newcastle on 15 November 1899, arriving in South Africa, at Durban, on 13 December 1899. He was present at the Relief of Kimberley and, in March 1900, left the Australian Horse and took up a commission with the British 16th Lancers: the regiment of his elder brother, Second Lieutenant Edwin Francis Fitzroy Osborne (1873-1895), who had died four years earlier, of enteric fever, at Lucknow, on 2 September 1895. He was closely involved in the surrender of Bloemfontein in March 1900; and, in early May 1900, he contracted enteric fever. He was hospitalized in Bloemfontein; however, his condition did not respond to treatment, and he was invalided to England.

Having participated in operations in the Orange Free State and Transvaal, and having seen action at Reit River, Klip Drift, Relief of Kimberley, Paardeberg, Poplar Grove, Dreifontein, Karee Siding, Belfast and Slingersfontein, Osborne was awarded the Queen's South Africa Medal with five clasps. His service is commemorated on a plaque (dedicated on 29 May 2011) affixed to the Bungendore and District War Memorial.

He remained on the "unattached list" until he formally resigned his commission in December 1904.

 Aide-de-camp to Earl Ranfurly 

In 1901, appointed to the rank of captain, he served as the aide-de-camp to Earl Ranfurly, the Governor-General of New Zealand, in particular, during the visit of the Duke and Duchess of Cornwall and York (later, King George V and Queen Mary) in June 1901.

 Stage and screen 
Later described as "a squatter who took to the stage for the love of a lady", Osborne made his stage debut (as "Nott Osborne"), at the last moment, in the role of Major Doria — Maud Jeffries was playing the part of Donna Romana Volonna — in a performance of The Eternal City (adapted for the stage from Hall Caine's novel of the same name), at Her Majesty's Theatre on 23 January 1904: "Mention may be made of Mr Nott Osborne as Major Doria (Governor of St Angelo), who, in making a promising stage debut, though obviously nervous over the first few words, displayed a pleasant voice and manner."

A reviewer of the premiere performance on 31 May 1918, noting that, although the movie itself was "distinctly amateurish" overall, did observe that "some of the best work in the picture is done by Mr. James Osborne".

 Death 
James Bunbury Nott Osborne died, aged 56, in Sydney, on 24 June 1934. He was interred at Waverley Cemetery, Sydney, along with the remains of his daughter Elizabeth Osborne (1911-1911).

 Marriage, children, and life after the theatre 

 Marriage 

Following their engagement in May 1904, she married James Bunbury Nott Osborne (1878-1934) — who was, by that time, also a member of her theatrical company — in a quiet, private ceremony, on 25 October 1904, at Papani, New Zealand. It was Jeffries' first, and only marriage.

 Bowylie 
In March 1906, Jeffries retired from the stage and happily devoted herself to a rural life on their family property, "Bowylie", near Gundaroo, New South Wales.

The property was originally known as "Talligandra". The current homestead, originally known as "Stoneville", built by the Massy family following the destruction of the earlier building in a bushfire in the 1870s, was purchased by the Osborne family in 1896 and renamed "Bowylie". Whilst some aspects of the current gardens were designed by William Guilfoyle, "most of the credit for planning and beautifying the gardens must go to Mrs James Osborne, who arrived as a bride in 1904. Mrs Osborne planted the Lambertiana hedges, laid out paths and gardens and kept an eye on extensive additions to the house".Gorgeous garden in Gundaroo, CityNews, (Wednesday, 9 November 2011), p.35.

 Children 
On 2 February 1894, and far from the United States, and representing herself as "Bertha Jeffreys" from Tasmania, she gave birth to a daughter, Florence Beatrice Jeffreys (1894-1974) – later Mrs. George Frederick Seymour — in North Carlton, Victoria, Australia.

The child, whose father was never identified, was immediately "taken in" by Patrick Joseph and Harriet Ann Walsh, née Deverson, also of North Carlton, who ran a boarding house for actors. Although the existence of the child was kept secret from the world in general, her daughter always knew the identity of her mother — whom she met at least once as a child and, after whom, she later named her own daughter.

Her 1904 marriage produced two children: a son, James Bedford Jeffries Osborne (1908-1984),Navy Service Record: Osborne, James Bedford Jeffries (Lieutenant). and a daughter, Elizabeth Osborne, born on 22 May 1911, who only lived for five weeks.Family Notices: Deaths: Osborne, The Sydney Morning Herald, (Monday, 3 July 1911), p.8. Later that same year, when her three-year-old son contracted diphtheria, and was admitted to the isolation ward at Yass Hospital, a deeply worried Jeffries, although quite well herself, having already experienced the death of her mother (who had died in Memphis, on 4 January) and the death of her daughter (on 2 July), went into quarantine with her son, rather than be separated from him. After several weeks in the hospital, and with the care of his mother, he was well enough for them both to return home.

 Picture postcards 
A constant, and important ongoing source of income for Jeffries was that derived from the royalties from the sale of a wide range of popular photographic postcards of her either in the costume of a particular stage role — as Mercia in The Sign of the Cross, as Kate Cregeen in The Manxman, as Elna in Daughters of Babylon, as Mariamne in Herod; A Tragedy  — or studio portraits representing her "off stage".http://nla.gov.au/nla.obj-136637689/view;jsessionid=1gct2lgx0fp7d181e7aag6502e

In 1904 it was reported that, even though payment was only six cents per copy, Jeffries had made at least $US10,000 from royalties in less than two years. Several years later, it was estimated that some 200,000 postcards of Jeffries had been sold in Sydney over the 1906 Christmas/New Year period alone.

 Maud Jeffries: "The Tombstone Angel" 
In early 1906 the London Daily Mail reported that one of the most popular postcards of Jeffries — portraying her in the role of Mercia in The Sign of the Cross — was being used as the model for the recently created "winged angel" that was rapidly replacing the "weeping angel" as the most popular item in memorial statuary.

In April, the Melbourne Age announced that "Miss Jeffries has instructed her London solicitors to announce that it is exceedingly distasteful to her to be associated with tombstones in any way, and the offending sculptors are being brought to book for the liberty they have taken";"Always thought that Maud Jeffries was of the disposition angelic, but the reverse is evidently the case, as the popular actress is said to be excessively annoyed at the idea of her classic physiognomy being reproduced by monumental masons as a suitable likeness of an angel. As Maud was never by any means "flighty", possibly it's the thought of putting on "wings" she objects to." (The (Brisbane) Truth, (Sunday 20 May 1906), p.6). and, soon, the following (humorous) paragraph was being widely circulated in the Australian press: "Miss Maud Jeffries denies, through her solicitors, that she has authorised the manufacture of marble reproductions of herself as tombstone angels. Her solicitors, nevertheless, write from Angel Court."

 Chrysanthemum Maud Jeffries 
Around 1906, G. Brunning and Sons, a plant nursery in St Kilda, Victoria, renowned for their chrysanthemum varieties, produced a cultivar — later described as "a decorative Japanese variety of the purest white, and one of the most valuable of these for late flowering and conservatory decoration" — which was officially named "Miss Maud Jeffries".

 Not that Mrs. Osborne 
On Sunday 20 January 1929, on the way to Redbank Station, Jugiong, near Harden, New South Wales, a motor car driven by a Mr. P. O'Rorke, crashed into an oncoming vehicle at the South Coast town of Narooma. The driver of the other vehicle, and O'Rorke's passenger, a "Mrs. Osborne", were badly injured and taken to hospital.

Given that the injured woman was a "Mrs. Osborne", from a property somewhere in rural New South Wales, it was immediately assumed that the woman was, indeed, Jeffries, and the news of the accident was widely broadcast in newspapers in Australia, New Zealand, the USA, Great Britain, and the British Colonies. Three days later, it was revealed that, rather than being the supposed "Mrs. J.B.N. Osborne" of Gundaroo, the accident victim was, in fact, Mrs. Elsie Evelyn Osborne (1878-1930), née Dickenson, of Redbank Station, Jugiong, NSW, the widow of Benjamin Marshall Osborne (thus "Mrs. B.M. Osborne").

 Death 
Maud Evelyn Craven Nott, née Jeffries, died of cancer, at her family property, "Bowylie", at Gundaroo, on 27 September 1946, aged 76 years.Maud Jeffries: Death of Former Actress, The Goulburn Evening Post, (Wednesday 2 October 1946), p.4; Former Actress Dies in Country, The Sydney Morning Herald, (Wednesday, 2 October 1946), p.5. She was privately interred at Waverley Cemetery, Sydney, along with the remains of her daughter Elizabeth Osborne (1911-1911), and her late husband, James Bunbury Nott Osborne (1878-1934).

 See also 
 Gundaroo Airport
 The Sign of the Cross Footnotes 

 References 

 Newspapers 
 Mr. Tree's Theatrical Company: Arrival by The Orient, The (Adelaide) Advertiser, (Tuesday, 25 August 1903), p.6.
 Ladies' Letter, (Melbourne) Table Talk, (Thursday, 5 May 1904), p.19.
 Family Notices: Marriages: Osborne—Jeffries, The Sydney Morning Herald, (Wednesday, 26 October 1904), p.8.
 Personalities: The Family of Osborne, The (Sydney) Sunday Times, (Sunday, 12 April 1914), p.12.
 Family Notices: Deaths: Osborne, The Sydney Morning Herald, (Monday, 5 June September 1934), p.8.
 MR. J.B.N. OSBORNE,Goulburn Evening Penny Post, (Wednesday, 4 July 1934), p.2.
 Family Notices: Deaths: Osborne, The Sydney Morning Herald, (Friday, 27 September 1946), p.18.
 R.W.B., "Stage Prejudice Broken: Wilson Barrett's 'Sign of the Cross'", The Age Literary Section, (Saturday, 24 January 1948), p.6.
 Maud Jeffries, Former Actress: Dramatic Star at Turn of the Century Dies in Australia — Once a Leading Beauty, The New York Yimes, (Saturday, 28 September 1946), p. 11.
 America gave us One of our Finest Actresses, The Canberra Times, (Thursday, 27 April 2000), p. 11.

 Other sources 
 Mr. Wilson Barrett's Farewell to Melbourne (Souvenir Theatre Programme), Princess Theatre, Melbourne, 21 May 1898.
 The Darling of the Gods (Theatre Programme), Her Majesty's Theatre, Melbourne, 1904: cast includes "Mr. Nott Osborne" and "Miss Maud Jeffries".
 Barrett, W. The Sign of the Cross, J.B. Lippincott Company, (Philadelphia), 1896: Barrett's novelized version of his play.
 Barrett, W., The Wilson Barrett Birthday Book: Illustrated, W. & D. Downey, (London), 1899.
 "Jeffries, Miss Maud", Browne, Walter & Koch, E. De Roy, Who's Who on the Stage 1908: The Dramatic Reference Book and Biographical Dictionary of the Theatre: Containing Careers of Actors, Actresses, Managers and Playwrights of the American Stage,  B.W. Dodge and Company, (New York), 1908, p.257.
 "Maud Jeffries", pp.184-185 in Clapp, John Bouvé  and Edgett, Edwin Francis, Players of the Present (Part II), The Dunlap Society, (New York) 1900.
 "Maud Jeffries, Actress", p.24 in Corry, M., Waverley Cemetery: Who’s Who: Encore! (Revised Version), Waverley Library, (Bondi Junction), 1996. 
 Disher, M.W., "Sex and Salvation: The Sign Of The Cross", pp.115-124 in Disher, M.W., Melodrama: Plots that Thrilled, The Macmillan Company, (New York), 1954.
 Hugonnet, P.J., Bungendore and District War Memorial: South African (Boer) War 1899-1902 Roll of Honour, Peter John Hugonnet, (Bungendore) 2011. 
 Kelly, Veronica, The Empire Actors: Stars of Australasian Costume Drama 1890s-1920s, Currency House, (Strawberry Hills), 2010. 
 Miss Maud Jeffries, p.34 in Lawrence, Boyle, Celebrities of the Stage, George Newnes, Limited, (London), 1900.
 Livingston, S., "Mad Love" The Ballad of Fred & Allie", Creative Nonfiction, No.48, Spring 2013.
 National Museum of Australia: Collection Highlights: Delaunay-Belleville Tourer.
 Shaw, G.B., "Mainly About Shakespeare", The Saturday Review, Vol.83, No.2170, (29 May 1897), pp.603-605.
 Thomas, J.M., The Art of the Actor-Manager: Wilson Barrett and the Victorian Theatre'', UMI Research Press, (Ann Arbor), 1984. 
 Thorpe, Clarissa, "Vintage love story: The tale of US actress Maud Jeffries and Australian farmer James Osborne", 666 ABC Canberra, 6 September 2015.

1869 births
People from Coahoma County, Mississippi
Actresses from Mississippi
19th-century American actresses
American stage actresses
20th-century American actresses
American emigrants to Australia
1946 deaths
Deaths from cancer in New South Wales